Robert Henry Elliot, (1837–1914), was an early British coffee planter in Mysore, India. He was the author of books about plantation life in Mysore and about farming in Scotland. He came from Kelso, Roxburghshire, Scotland.

Plantations
According to Elliot's own account in Gold, Sport, and Coffee Planting In Mysore, he arrived in Bombay in 1855 at 18 years of age. From there he sailed to Mangalore, then headed inland through the ghauts to the high plateau of Mysore, where he joined Frederick Green, who had begun his plantation in 1843. In 1856 Elliot started his own plantation at Bartchinhulla, Sakleshpur, Mysore State.

Mixed planting
At his farm called Clifton Park in Kelso, Scotland, he formulated what he termed the "Clifton Park System". Several editions of his book on the subject, Agricultural Changes appeared between 1898 and 1943. (The last two editions of 1908 and 1943 being entitled The Clifton Park System of Farming and laying down land to grass.) In this book, which was written prior to the widespread availability and adoption of man-made fertilizer, he advocated building up the organic content of soil by planting a mixture of grasses and other plants, particularly deep-rooted plants such as chicory. Modern organic growers still find Elliot's work applicable today.

Selected works
The Experience of a Planter in the Jungles of Mysore, London: Chapman and Hall, 1871
Concerning John’s Indian affairs, London: Chapman and Hall, 1872
Written on their Foreheads, 2 vols, London: Sampson Low, 1879
On laying down permanent pastures, and the grasses suitable for alternate husbandry
Union Agricultural Society Lectures, no. 2. Kelso, 1883
Gold, Sport, And Coffee Planting In Mysore, 1898 (Project Gutenberg etext)
The Clifton Park System of Farming and laying down land to grass, 1898–1953 (two under the alternative title Agricultural Changes)

See also
The Clifton Park System of Farming
Thirty Years Farming on the Clifton Park System – an account by English farmer William Lamin of his experiences with Elliot's recommendations

External links

Scottish writers
1837 births
1914 deaths